Live: Entertainment or Death is the first official live album by American heavy metal band Mötley Crüe. Released on November 23, 1999, it is a compilation of recordings from 1982 to 1999. However, it contains no songs from the band's self-titled 1994 album, nor 1997's Generation Swine. "We picked the stuff that sounded the best without having to touch it up," Nikki Sixx observed in 2000. "We still play some of those songs [from Generation Swine] in the set; they just didn't make the final tracklisting."

The album charted at number 133 on the Billboard 200.

Controversy
In a review of the album at the time of its release, hard rock/heavy metal website Metal Sludge revealed that vocals on a small percentage of the tracks had been "redone" or "touched up" in the studio, calling into question how much of the record was a genuine live document. The website provided dates and suggested that side-by-side audio comparisons to bootlegs from shows from which the tracks for the album were culled form the basis for their claim. Mötley Crüe remained silent on the issue.

Track listing
Disc 1
 "Looks That Kill" – 6:06 (recorded 11/25/85) (Nikki Sixx)
 "Knock 'Em Dead, Kid" – 3:35 (recorded 3/14/84) (Sixx, Vince Neil)
 "Too Young to Fall in Love" – 3:57 (recorded 3/14/84) (Sixx)
 "Live Wire" – 4:19 (recorded 3/14/84) (Sixx)
 "Public Enemy #1" – 4:53 (recorded 11/19/82) (Sixx, Lizzie Grey)
 "Shout at the Devil" – 4:19 (recorded 3/14/84) (Sixx)
 "Merry-Go-Round" – 3:22 (recorded 11/19/82) (Sixx)
 "Ten Seconds to Love" – 4:46 (recorded 12/2/98) (Sixx, Neil)
 "Piece of Your Action" – 4:06 (recorded 11/19/82) (Sixx, Neil)
 "Starry Eyes" – 4:37 (recorded 11/19/82) (Sixx)
 "Helter Skelter" – 4:17 (recorded 11/19/82) (John Lennon, Paul McCartney)

Disc 2
 "Smokin' in the Boys Room" – 5:18 (recorded 11/25/85) (Cub Koda, Michael Lutz)
 "Don't Go Away Mad (Just Go Away)" – 4:14 (recorded 7/31/90) (Sixx, Mick Mars)
 "Wild Side" – 5:52 (recorded 3/10/99)(Sixx, Tommy Lee, Neil)
 "Girls, Girls, Girls" – 4:50 (recorded 12/2/98) (Sixx, Lee, Mars)
 "Dr. Feelgood" – 5:13 (recorded 3/10/99) (Sixx, Mars)
 "Without You" – 3:05 (recorded 7/31/90) (Sixx, Mars)
 "Primal Scream" – 5:42 (recorded 12/2/98) (Sixx)
 "Same Ol' Situation (S.O.S.)" – 4:33 (recorded 3/10/99) (Lee, Sixx, Neil, Mars)
 "Home Sweet Home" – 4:06 (recorded 12/2/98) (Sixx, Neil, Lee)
 "Kickstart My Heart" – 5:39 (recorded 3/10/99) (Sixx)
 "Wild Side" [Video] [Bonus Track]

Personnel
Vince Neil – vocals; guitar (on Don't Go Away Mad and Same Ol' Situation)
Mick Mars – lead guitar
Nikki Sixx – bass
Tommy Lee – drums, piano on "Home Sweet Home"

References

Mötley Crüe live albums
1999 live albums
Self-released albums